Sherine Wagdy (born as Sherine Farouk Salem in Cairo, Egypt) is an Egyptian singer who appeared in Road to Eilat (1994).

Albums 
 Romeo w Juliet
 Enta El Nos El Helw
 Saddaqny
 Maqdarshy
 Law Benna Eih
 Wala Leila
 Kol Da
 Layaly Hayaty

Singles 
 Erga3ly
 Law Benna Eih
 Lafeit Belad Allah (featuring Guitara Band)
 Wala Leila
 W Da Yerdy Min
 El Badr
 Kol Da
 Ana Ba2a
 Law Youm Bey3ady

References 

Year of birth missing (living people)
Living people
21st-century Egyptian women singers
Singers from Cairo